Trees for the Future (abbreviated sometimes as TREES) is a Maryland-based nonprofit organization founded on August 14, 1989, that trains farmers around the world in agroforestry and sustainable land use.

TREES provides technical assistance with the help of mechanical, forestry and agricultural engineers and training in their signature methodology, which they call the Forest Garden Approach. Farmers who join their training program - whether through one of their field offices or online via their Forest Garden Training Center - receive instruction on planting trees on their own farms and integrating them into regenerative agricultural systems for increased farm productivity, sustainability, and food security.

Since their founding in 1989, TREES has planted over 260 million trees with more than 25,000 farmers around the world. In June 2021, they announced their intention to plant one billion trees as part of global reforestation efforts led by the United Nations Decade on Ecosystem Restoration.

Overview

Trees for the Future is a 501(c)(3) nonprofit whose mission is to end poverty and hunger by training farmers in regenerative agriculture, through what they call the Forest Garden Approach.

Location

Over their 30+ year history, they have worked in more than 50 countries around the world, in Haiti, Latin America, South America, Sub-Saharan Africa and Southeast Asia. In 2014, they focused their work on select African countries, where the climatic and economic challenges were the most pressing, and they felt they could make the greatest impact.

Trees for the Future currently works with thousands of farming families in nine countries throughout Sub-Saharan Africa. They have offices and staff in Kenya, Mali, Senegal, Uganda and Tanzania. They work in Cameroon, Central African Republic, Chad and Gambia. Their headquarters is in Silver Spring, Maryland.

Trees for the Future divides their work into three categories: Expansion, Collaboration and Replication.

Expansion – Through their Forest Garden Training Program, TREES staff work with farmer groups to establish Forest Gardens over a four-year period. There are typically between 150 – 300 farmers in these projects.

Collaboration – Trees for the Future works with local organizations and community groups who are already doing great work in the region but could benefit from agroforestry training.

Replication – Once farmers go through the Forest Garden program, they can "Plant it Forward" and train neighboring farmers in a condensed version of the program.

The Forest Garden Approach (FGA)

Through their 4-year training program, farmers plant thousands of trees that protect the land and bring nutrients back to the soil. Farmers are taught to plant trees in a way that optimizes land use, eliminates the need for chemical pesticides and fertilizers, and reserves water and sequesters carbon, what they call the Forest Garden.

The Forest Garden provides farmers with diverse, nutritious crops that they can feed their families and sell on the market all year round. Forest Garden farmers increase their access to food and increase their income, even in the first year, all while improving the environment.

Forest Gardens are, on average, 1 acre in size. One farmer, or farming family, cares for each Forest Garden on their own land. The average Forest Garden has 2,500 trees, most of which are planted in the first or second year along the Forest Garden’s perimeter, which Trees for the Future calls the “Living Fence”. In the third and fourth years, the remaining trees are strategically placed where it will best benefit the farmer’s Forest Garden. On average, a Forest Garden offsets 144.64 metric tons of carbon dioxide per acre over 20 years.

Collaborative Partnerships

Trees for the Future works closely with Futures Agribusiness (FAGRIB) in Chad and Cameroon to teach farmers the Forest Garden Approach.

In 2019, they partnered with the Kenya Scout Association (KSA) to contribute to Kenya’s 2030 Vision to restore 10% of Kenya’s tree cover, by developing tree nurseries at schools.

In Gambia, TREES works with Gambia Rising to provide access to education and water, as well as income and nutrition opportunities through the Forest Garden Approach.

Trees for the Future works with The Great Green Wall in Senegal and Mali, supporting their initiative to bring life back to Africa’s degraded landscapes whilst providing food security, jobs and security for families throughout the Sub-Saharan region.

UN and SDGs

Trees for the Future’s work in agroforestry meets nine out of seventeen United Nations Sustainable Development Goals:

Environment:

Goal 12: Ensure Sustainable consumption and productive patterns

Goal 13: Take urgent action to combat climate change and its impacts

Goal 15: Protect, restore and promote sustainable use of terrestrial ecosystems, sustainably manage forests, combat desertification and halt and reverse land degradation and halt biodiversity loss.

Food Security + Nutrition

Goal 2: End hunger, achieve food security and improved nutrition and promote sustainable agriculture.

Goal 3: Ensure healthy lives and promote well-being for all ages

Economic + Social Equity

Goal 1: End poverty in all its forms everywhere

Goal 8: Promote sustained, inclusive and sustainable economic growth, full and productive employment and decent work for all.

Goal 10: Reduce inequality within and among countries

Goal 17: Strengthen the means of implementation and revitalize the global partnership for sustainable development

History
Trees for the Future, originally called The New Forests Project, was incorporated as a 50(c)(3) nonprofit in 1989 by their founder Dave Deppner.

In June 1993, Trees for the Future was invited to join the White House panel on Global Climate Change, where they continued to serve through 2000.

In response to Hurricane Mitch in November 1998, TREES began planting trees in Honduras and later expanded across Central America. By December 2003, they had planted 30 million trees globally.

In 2005, Trees for the Future established the world’s first long-distance training program which reached over 2,000 trainees in four years.

In 2006, TREES was recognized by Honduran President Manuel Zelaya, Ethiopian President Girma Wolde-Giorgis and Nobel Prize winning activist and tree planter Wangari Maathai at the United Nations Headquarters in New York.

In February 2010, the Maryland House of Delegates recognized TREES for two decades of reforestation leadership and the planting of 65 million trees.

On September 10, 2011, TREES’ Executive Director Dave Deppner died and was replaced by his friend and colleague, John Leary.

In December 2014, TREES reached 100 million trees planted.

In 2015, TREES streamlined its approach, ending their active projects around the world so that they could focus on implementing the Forest Garden Approach in Sub-Saharan Africa, starting with Senegal, Tanzania, Uganda, Cameroon and Kenya. They also announced a new strategic goal, to plant 500 million trees by 2025.

In April 2017, Executive Director John Leary published “One Shot: Trees as Our Last Chance for Survival.” In September of that year, One Shot received the Nautilus Award.

In September 2017, TREES launched the Forest Garden Training Center to provide an online platform for Forest Garden practitioners around the world.

In mid-2020, TREES reached 200 million trees planted around the world.

In 2021, TREES announced a 2030 goal to plant one billion trees with smallholder farmers in Sub-Saharan Africa. This new goal came with the June 5th launch of the United Nations Decade on Ecosystem Restoration, a global effort to spur global restoration efforts between 2021 and 2030. As an official implementing partner of the UN Decade, TREES will focus on farmland restoration, aiming to restore degraded soil, increase tree cover, support biodiversity, capture carbon and increase both food access and income security through agroforestry and sustainable tree planting.

In 2022, they announced that they'd be expanding their Executive Team. John Leary stepped into the newly established role of Chief Strategy Officer (CSO) in an effort to reach the organization's goal of planting one billion trees by 2030. Tim McLellan, a leader in sustainability and community development, was selected to fill the role of Interim Chief Executive Officer. A search committee, chaired by Board Member Shannon Hawkins, will lead the recruitment of a permanent CEO.

On April 1, 2022, Trees for the Future announces their new look and logo in honor of Earth Month.

To date, TREES has planted 250 million trees around the world. In 2022, they plan to plant 55.3 million trees and will continue to scale up over the next decade their training program, collaborative partnerships, and growing network of farmers and agroforestry experts.

See also
Ecosia
Plant with Purpose

References

External links
 

Environmental organizations based in Maryland
Forest conservation organizations
1989 establishments in Maryland
Organizations established in 1989